General elections were held in Argentina on 27 October 2019, to elect the president of Argentina, members of the national congress and the governors of most provinces. Former Cabinet Chief Alberto Fernández of Frente de Todos defeated incumbent president Mauricio Macri of Juntos por el Cambio, exceeding the threshold to win the presidency in a single round. Macri became the first incumbent president in Argentine history to be defeated in his reelection bid.

Electoral system
The election of the president was conducted under the ballotage system, a modified version of the two-round system. A candidate can win the presidency in a single round by either winning 45% of the vote, or if they win 40% of the vote while finishing 10 percentage points ahead of the second-place candidate. If no candidate meets either threshold, a runoff takes place between the top two candidates. Voting is compulsory for citizens between 18 and 70 years old. Suffrage was also extended to 16- and 17-year-olds, though without compulsory voting.

There are a total of 257 seats of the Chamber of Deputies. They are elected from 24 electoral districts–the 23 provinces, plus the federal district of Buenos Aires, which elects its own executive and legislature and is represented in the national Congress like all other provinces. The number of seats are distributed in relation to the population of the province. One-third of the seats in the Chamber of Deputies are reserved for women. The 130 seats of the Chamber of Deputies up for election were elected from 24 multi-member constituencies based on the 23 provinces and Buenos Aires. Seats were allocated using the D'Hondt method of proportional representation, with an electoral threshold of 3%.

The 24 seats in the Senate up for election were elected in three-seat constituencies using the closed list system. Each district is represented by three senatorial seats. Each party is allowed to register up to two candidates; one of those registered must be female. The party receiving the most votes wins two seats, and the second-placed party wins one. The third senatorial seat was established in the Constitution of 1994 in order to better represent the largest minority in each district.

Congress

Chamber of Deputies 

The 257 members of the Chamber of Deputies are elected by proportional representation in 24 multi-member constituencies based on the provinces (plus the City of Buenos Aires). Seats are allocated using the d'Hondt method with a 3% electoral threshold. In this election, 130 of the 257 seats are up for renewal for a 4-year term.

Senate 

The 72 members of the Senate are elected in the same 24 constituencies, with three seats in each. The party receiving the most votes in each constituency wins two seats, with the third seat awarded to the second-placed party. The 2019 elections will see one-third of Senators renewed, with eight provinces electing three Senators for a 6-year term; Buenos Aires City, Chaco, Entre Ríos, Neuquén, Río Negro, Salta, Santiago del Estero and Tierra del Fuego.

Candidates
The following candidates successfully registered their nominations before the limit date of 22 June 2019, and went on to compete in the Open, Simultaneous and Mandatory Primaries (PASO) on 11 August 2019.

Opinion polls

Results

Primary elections

Open primary elections for the Presidency were held nationwide on 11 August. With this system, all parties run primary elections on a single ballot. All parties must take part in it, both the parties with internal factions and parties with a single candidate list. Citizens may vote for any candidate of any party, but may only cast a single vote. The most voted candidate of parties gaining 1.5% or higher of the valid votes advances to the general election.

Fernández came top with 47.8% of the vote, with Macri trailing behind with 31.8%. Lavagna, del Caño, Gómez Centurión and Espert all received enough valid votes to participate in the general election.

President

Fernández owed his victory mostly to Buenos Aires Province swinging over dramatically to support him; he carried it by over 1.6 million votes over Macri, accounting for almost all of his nationwide margin of 2.1 million votes. By comparison, Daniel Scioli only carried the province by 219,000 votes in 2015.

Results by district

Chamber of Deputies

Results by province

Senate

Results by province

Provincial Elections

References

Argentina
Elections in Argentina
October 2019 events in Argentina
Presidential elections in Argentina
Election and referendum articles with incomplete results